Ectopic kidney describes a kidney that is not located in its usual position. It results from the kidney failing to ascend from its origin in the true pelvis or from a superiorly ascended kidney located in the thorax.

It has an incidence of approximately 1/900.

See also
 Crossed dystopia

References

External links 

Nephrology
Congenital disorders of urinary system
Kidney anatomy